The Goya Award for Best  (Spanish: Premio Goya a la mejor ) is one of the Goya Awards, Spain's principal national film awards. The category was first presented at the ninth edition of the Goya Awards with El sueño de Adán directed by Mercedes Gaspar being the first winner of the category.

The short film The Lady and the Reaper (2009) was nominated for the Academy Award for Best Animated Short Film at the 82nd Academy Awards. At the European Film Awards, the short films The Trumouse Show (2004) and Minotauromaquia, Pablo en el Laberinto (2005) have received nominations for Best Short Film.

Winners and nominees

1990s

2000s

2010s

2020s

References

External links
Official site
IMDb: Goya Awards

Goya Awards